Protein sprouty homolog 4 is a protein that in humans is encoded by the SPRY4 gene.

Function 

SPRY4 is an inhibitor of the receptor-transduced mitogen-activated protein kinase (MAPK) signaling pathway. It is positioned upstream of RAS (see HRAS; MIM 190020) activation and impairs the formation of active GTP-RAS (Leeksma et al., 2002).

Interactions 

SPRY4 has been shown to interact with TESK1.

See also 
MAPK signaling pathway
Ras subfamily

References

Further reading

External links 
 PDBe-KB provides an overview of all the structure information available in the PDB for Human Protein sprouty homolog 4 (SPRY4)

SPR domain
Human proteins